Margon may refer to the following places in France:

Margon, Eure-et-Loir, a commune in the Eure-et-Loir department 
Margon, Hérault, a commune in the Hérault department